Antonio Vallisneri (Trassilico,3 May 1661 – Padua, 18 January 1730), also rendered as Antonio Vallisnieri, was an Italian medical scientist, physician and naturalist.

Life
Vallisneri was born in Trassilico, a small village in Garfagnana, and graduated in medicine in 1684, in Reggio Emilia, under the guidance of Marcello Malpighi. A grand-uncle was the physician Cesare Magati.

He studied at Bologna, Venice, Padua and Parma and held the chairs of Practical Medicine first and Theoretical Medicine later at the University of Padua between 1700 and his death.

Influenced by famous thinkers such as Leibniz and Conti he belonged to the Galilean school of experimental scientists. He worked in biology, botany, veterinary medicine, hydrology and the newly born science geology.

Vallisneri died in Padua in 1730.

Importance

He is known for being one of the first researchers in medicine to have proposed abandoning the Aristotelian theories for an experimental approach based on the scientific principles suggested by Galileo Galilei. Vallisneri stated that scientific knowledge is best acquired through experience and reasoning. This principle was followed in his  anatomical dissections and carefully drawn descriptions of insects. For this reason, his medical career was at the center of heated controversy, as many of his contemporaries could not abandon prevailing medieval theories, even in the face of glaring experimental evidence.

He also was keenly interested in the natural sciences, and over his lifetime collected numerous specimens of animals, minerals and other natural objects. Unfortunately his scientific method was limited when it came to interpreting fossil evidence on mountain tops; the only possibility he allowed for was a miraculous Biblical Flood (Flood geology) as the cause for their deposition.

He had a very clear and precise style of writing. In 1709 he joined Francesco Scipio Maffei and Apostolo Zeno in editing a literary journal, Giornale de' Letterati d'Italia, which had a brief life. Vallisneri's contribution to the use of language makes him one of the most admired science writers, in the tradition of Galilei, Francesco Redi and Lorenzo Magalotti. Vallisneri also followed Galilei's tracks in electing Italian as the language of choice for writing his treatises. This was a courageous choice in the scientific community of the time, which still used Latin as the “language of knowledge.”

Works

Legacy
The freshwater plant genus Vallisneria commemorates him.

Notes

External links
Curiosity and Ingenuity Link to a virtual exhibition of the collections of Vallisneri, held by the Museums of the University of Padova.
De Corpi Marini and Lezione accademica intorno all'origine delle fontane - full digital facsimiles at Linda Hall Library

1661 births
1730 deaths
People from Gallicano
Italian naturalists
17th-century Italian physicians
18th-century Italian physicians
Fellows of the Royal Society
Italian feminists
Academic staff of the University of Padua